WEZL (103.5 MHz) is a commercial FM radio station licensed to Charleston, South Carolina, and serving the Lowcountry.  It broadcasts a country music radio format and is owned by iHeartMedia, Inc.  WEZL carries two nationally syndicated shows:  The Bobby Bones Show on weekday mornings and CMT Nights with Cody Alan, heard overnights.  The radio studios and offices are on Houston Northcutt Boulevard in Mount Pleasant.

WEZL has an effective radiated power (ERP) of 100,000 watts, the maximum for non-grandfathered FM stations.  The transmitter is off Venning Road in Mount Pleasant, amid the towers for other Charleston-area FM and TV stations.  WEZL broadcasts using HD Radio technology.  Its HD2 digital subchannel carries iHeartRadio's soft adult contemporary music service, known as "The Breeze."

History
On October 5, 1970, the station first signed on the air.  It was owned by the Fine Arts Broadcasting with studios on Church Street.  In its early days, it had an effective radiated power of 25,900 watts.

The Weasel Morning Show consisted of longtime radio personalities TJ Phillips, Gary Griffin and Ric Rush. TJ, Gary and Ric were consistently the top rated morning show in Charleston.  Griffin retired in 2012. Phillips and Rush continued as the morning hosts before being moved to afternoons to make way for the syndicated Bobby Bones Show airing weekday mornings from Nashville.

WEZL has been a country station in the Charleston market for 50 years, dating back to 1972. In 2007, it started competing with Citadel Broadcasting's country station, WIWF 96.9 FM.  WIWF later switched to classic hits.  Currently WEZL's country competition is 92.5 WCKN, owned by Saga Communications.

"The Weasel" had the number one morning show for years prior to the arrival of Mike Tyler in January 1999. Tyler, Griffin and Janet Walsh fell to number 5 but regained the top spot in Fall 1999.

References

External links
WEZL official website

Country radio stations in the United States
EZL
Radio stations established in 1999
IHeartMedia radio stations
1999 establishments in South Carolina